Tai Enosa (born 1 October 1989, in American Samoa) is an American rugby union player who plays fly-half for the Seattle Seawolves in Major League Rugby (MLR).

Professional rugby career

Enosa has played for the United States national under-20 rugby union team, including playing in the 2009 IRB Junior World Rugby Trophy tournament held in Kenya, and helping guide the US team to a second-place finish.

Enosa was named to the US national sevens team in 2009, and in 2012 signed a professional contract to play full-time for the US national sevens team.

Enosa joined the USA Eagles player pool in 2009 and made his test match debut in 2011 against Tonga.  Enosa scored the winning try that put the USA Eagles over Russia in their final Churchill Cup game. Enosa was a member of the US squad for the 2011 Rugby World Cup in New Zealand, where he played in one game.

On a club level, Enosa played for Tempe, before transferring to Belmont Shore.

Enosa played for San Diego Legion of Major League Rugby from 2019 to 2021, but joined Seattle Seawolves in 2022.

See also
 United States national under-20 rugby union team

References

External links
 

1989 births
Living people
American rugby union players
United States international rugby union players
United States international rugby sevens players
San Diego Legion players
People from Faga'alu
American Samoan rugby union players
Rugby union fly-halves
Seattle Seawolves players